Uzbekisation or Uzbekization is the process of something or someone culturally non-Uzbek becoming, or being forced to become, Uzbek. The term is often used to describe the process by which the autonomous republic Tajik ASSR was incorporated within the Uzbek Soviet Socialist Republic between 1924 and 1929, and the attendant assimilation of Tajiks.

Because of assimilation pressures that began in 1924 with the creation of Uzbek SSR, ethnic Tajiks often chose to identify themselves as Uzbeks in population census forms and preferred to be registered as Uzbek in their passports to avoid leaving the republic for the less developed agricultural and mountainous Tajikistan. While official Uzbek statistics place the total Tajik population in Uzbekistan at about 5%, subjective expert estimates suggest that the Tajiks may account for as much as 25%-30% of the total population of the country.

After the dissolution of the Soviet Union, the term "Uzbekization" has been applied to the processes in Uzbekistan that reverse the results of Sovietization and Russification. Among these are restoring the importance of Uzbek language, which replaced the Russian language in obligatory education, promotion of Uzbek tradition and culture.

See also 
 Turkification
 Sinicization
 Russification

References

Cultural assimilation
Uzbekistani culture
Ethnic Tajik people